Trachylepis albilabris, the Guinea mabuya, is a species of skink found in Africa.

References

Trachylepis
Reptiles of West Africa
Reptiles of Uganda
Reptiles described in 1857
Taxa named by Edward Hallowell (herpetologist)